Al-Bajjaria or Al-bujari (ālbǧāryh) is a Levantine dish popular in Deir ez-Zor, usually offered at events and weddings have been named Bajjaria relative to the tribe Baggara.

Components 
Al-bajjaria is a mutton lamb cooked only ghee and placed after cooking on a number of loaves of unleavened bread orsheet, which is cut and placed in the mince and placed aside some green onions and radish as a kind of ornamental.

Preparation 
Add water with the addition of onions, salt, bay leaf, pepper red, cloves and cinnamon to give special food flavor, and after preparing is poured out in Manasef which is placed tandoor bread.

References 

Arab cuisine
Levantine cuisine
Syrian cuisine